Erika Bók is a Hungarian actress who has appeared exclusively in the films of Béla Tarr.

Filmography

References

External links
 

Hungarian actresses
Living people
Year of birth missing (living people)
Place of birth missing (living people)